Diamond Head is the seventh studio album by heavy metal band Diamond Head, released on 22 April 2016. This is the first album from the band to feature Rasmus Bom Andersen as the lead vocalist. The album reached number 15 on the UK Rock & Metal Albums Chart.

Track listing

Personnel
Rasmus Bom Andersen – vocals
Brian Tatler – lead and rhythm guitar
Andy "Abbz" Abberley – rhythm and lead guitar
Eddie "Chaos" Moohan – bass
Karl Wilcox – drums

References

External links
Diamond Head official website 
 Official preview video

Diamond Head (band) albums
2016 albums